Tim McDonald is an Australian comedian. He is best known for his regular guest appearances on the Australian comedy news quiz shows Have You Been Paying Attention? and more recently as co-host of The Cheap Seats with comedian and actress Melanie Bracewell. Both of these series are produced by Working Dog Productions and are a mix of news and comedy. McDonald was  named among Radio Todays Top New Talent to Watch in 2019.

Television 
Since 2019, McDonald has been a regular guest on Network 10's show Have You Been Paying Attention?, in which the host Tom Gleisner quizzes guests on the top news stories of the week. Have You Been Paying Attention? has won a number of Logie Awards.

McDonald also co-hosts and writes a show by Network 10 and Working Dog Productions, The Cheap Seats, alongside New Zealand comedian Melanie Bracewell. The Cheap Seats debuted in 2021 and takes a comedic look over the week's news, entertainment and sport. In the ratings, The Cheap Seats is sitting in the top 20 among the 25-54 year-old age group.

McDonald has also worked behind the scenes in a number of Working Dog Productions. He was the social media producer for Utopia, a Logie Award-winning Australian television comedy series on the ABC.

Radio 
McDonald and Sam Garlepp hosted a Triple M show entitled The Smoko in 2019, running on Wednesdays from 12–2pm. This opportunity arose through the SCA Hubble program, following the success of the Tim & Sammy podcast and their social media following. Radio Today described The Smoko  as "the perfect mix of satire, observational humour and fake callers".

McDonald and Garlepp also hosted The Sunday Experiment, in 2019, running on Sundays from 8–10pm on Australia's Hit Network.

In 2019, McDonald and Garlepp were named in Radio Todays Top New Talent to Watch.

McDonald has also been a regular guest on the Marty Sheargold Show, an Australian breakfast radio show on Triple M throughout 2021.

Podcasts 
McDonald is a part of the duo The Reserve Drivers podcast alongside Luke Rocca. It is a classic Aussie comedy ‘taking the piss’ podcast by well educated F1 racing fans.

References

External links  
 

Australian comedians
Australian media personalities
Living people
University of Melbourne alumni
1993 births